The Young Wisden Cricketer of the Year is a cricketer selected for the honour by the annual publication Wisden Cricketers' Almanack. The decision is based upon "his or her performances in school's cricket, as reported in Wisden". Wisden has included details of schools cricket as far back as its second edition in 1865, when it carried an account of the match between Eton College and Harrow School. In 1918 and 1919, as no first-class cricket was being played due to the First World War, the five Wisden Cricketers of the Year were chosen from public schools. The first Young Wisden Cricketer of the Year was named in 2008, in the 144th edition of Wisden Cricketers' Almanack, in an effort to "help raise the profile of schools cricket, especially at state schools." The first winner was Jonny Bairstow of St Peter's School, York.

The first eight winners of the award were all batsman. Douglas Henderson partially explained the reason for this in the 2010 edition of Wisden, pointing out that restrictions on young pace bowlers restricts them to bowling no more than 21 overs per day, therefore limiting their chances of taking many wickets. The first three recipients of the award; Bairstow, James Taylor and Jos Buttler have gone on to represent England in Test cricket.

No award was made for the 2020 season, as the school cricket programme was reduced by the COVID-19 pandemic in the United Kingdom. To compensate, Wisden compiled a notional list of winners from 1900 to 2006, which included a number of future Test cricketers.

Winners

See also
 Cricket Writers' Club Young Cricketer of the Year

Notes

References

Cricket awards and rankings
Wisden